De Donk  (other names: Braankse Donk, and Den Donk) is a hamlet in Molenlanden, which is a municipality in the Dutch province of South Holland. De Donk is 2 km northwestern of the village of Brandwijk and consists of some farms on a five-meter-high sandhill.

References 
  Website former municipality of Graafstroom

Populated places in South Holland
Molenlanden